Yawhen Minenkow (born 11 April 1988) is a Belarusian former professional footballer.

References

External links

Profile at teams.by

1988 births
Living people
Belarusian footballers
Association football defenders
FC Darida Minsk Raion players
FC Rudziensk players
FC Smolevichi players
FC Slavia Mozyr players
FC Slonim-2017 players
FC Orsha players
People from Barysaw
Sportspeople from Minsk Region